Frey is a surname of German origin, from the Middle High German word "vri," meaning "free," and as a name, it referred to a free man, as opposed to a bondsman or serf in the feudal system.
Other variations include Freyr, Freyer, Freyda, Freyman, Freyberg, Freystein, Fray, Frayr, Frayda, Frayberg, Frayman, Freeman.

Frei, Frey, Fray, Frej or Freij is the surname of the following people

Frei
Alexander Frei, Swiss football player
Arturo Frei, Chilean politician
Beatrice Frei, Swiss curler
Carl Frei, German organ builder
Carmen Frei, Chilean politician
Christian Frei, Swiss filmmaker
Eduardo Frei Montalva, president of Chile
Eduardo Frei Ruiz-Tagle, president of Chile
Emil Frei, an American physician and oncologist
Fabian Frei, Swiss football player
Frances X. Frei, American academic and businesswoman
Günther Frei (born 1942), Swiss mathematician and historian of mathematics
Hans Wilhelm Frei, American theologian
Heinz Frei, Swiss wheelchair athlete
Jerry Frei, American basketball coach
Karl Frei, a Swiss gymnast and Olympic Champion
Kerim Frei, Turkish-Swiss football player
Matt Frei, British-German television journalist
Max Frei, a Ukrainian/Russian fantasy writer
Peter Frei, Swiss former alpine skier who competed in the 1968 Winter Olympics
Sandra Frei, Swiss snowboarder
Stefan Frei, Swiss football player
Tanya Frei, Swiss curler and Olympic medalist
Thomas Frei, Swiss bicycle racer
Thomas Frei (biathlete), Swiss biathlete
Thorsten Frei (born 1973), German politician
Wilhelm Siegmund Frei, German medical researcher

Freij
Elias Freij (1918–1998), Palestinian Christian politician
Fahd Jassem al-Freij (born 1950), Syrian Minister of Defense
Gustav Freij (1922–1973), Swedish wrestler
Leif Freij (1943–1998), Swedish wrestler, nephew of Gustav

Frej
Issawi Frej (born 1963), Israeli Arab politician
Saber Ben Frej (born 1979), Tunisian footballer

Frey
Aaron Frey, American politician
Albert Frey (disambiguation), multiple people
Alexander Frey (politician) (1877–1945), Finnish politician and banker
Alexander Frey, American conductor
Alexander Moritz Frey, German author
Alice Frey, Belgian painter
Allan H. Frey, American neuroscientist
Amber Frey
Bernard Frey, appellant in Frey v. Fedoruk et al.
Bruno Frey, Swiss economist
Christopher Frey, German writer
Darcy Frey, American writer
Diana Frey, Argentine film producer
Donald N. Frey, an American innovator in manufacturing
Emil Frey (1838–1922), Swiss politician

Gerhard Frey, German mathematician
Gerhard Frey (politician), (1933–2013) German politician (DVU)
Glenn Frey (1948–2016), American recording artist and actor
Greg Frey, American football player
Heinrich Frey (1822–1890), Swiss entomologist
Henri-Nicolas Frey (1847–1932), French major general
James Frey, American writer
James N. Frey, American writer
Jim Frey, American baseball manager
John P. Frey, American labor activist
Joseph Samuel C. F. Frey (born Joseph Levi; 1771–1850), missionary
Konrad Frey, German gymnast
Leonard Frey, American actor
Lonny Frey, American baseball player
Louis Frey, Jr. (1934–2019), American politician
Łucja Frey, Polish physician and neurologist
Max Frey (1874–1944), German painter and graphic artist
Mogens Frey, Danish cyclist
Nicolas Frey, French footballer, brother of Sébastien
Oli Frey, Swiss magazine illustrator
Oliver W. Frey, American politician
Paul Frey, Canadian operatic tenor
Perry A. Frey, American biochemist
Peter Frey, German journalist
Petra Frey, Austrian singer
Raymond G. Frey (1941–2012), American philosopher
R. Scott Frey, American contemporary sociologist
Richard Karl Hjalmar Frey (1886–1965), Finnish entomologist, specialist of Diptera
Richard L. Frey, (1905–1988), American bridge player
Roger Frey (1913–1997), French politician
Sébastien Frey (born 1980), French football goalkeeper, brother of Nicolas
Stephen Frey, American author
Steve Frey, American baseball player
Toomas Frey, Estonian botanist and ecologist
William J. Frey (1929-2011), American politician, businessman, and farmer

Fray
Arron Fray (born 1987), English soccer player
David Fray (born 1981), French classical pianist
Derek Fray FRS, British material scientist and professor
Sir John Fray (died 1461), English lawyer and court official
Terryn Fray (born 1991), Bermudan cricketer
Tom Fray (born 1979), English cricketer

In fiction
House Frey from A Song of Ice and Fire
Dieter Frey from Call for the Dead le Carre

See also
Freya (disambiguation)
Fry (surname)
Frye
Fray (surname)

References

Surnames from status names

External links
 Frey Name Meaning & History

German-language surnames
Russian Mennonite surnames

fr:Frey
is:Freyr
nl:Frey
ja:フレイ (曖昧さ回避)
ru:Фрей (значения)
fi:Frey
vi:Frey (định hướng)